Kraken IV + V Live the National Rock is the name of a studio album compilation of the Colombian group Kraken It was released on April 2, 2004 by Discos Fuentes.

Information 
This album brings a total of fifteen songs from the record works Kraken IV and V.

Track listing

References 

Kraken (band) albums
2004 albums